Elyon (formerly known as Ascent: Infinite Realm) was a massively multiplayer online role-playing game developed by Bluehole and published by Kakao Games. The game has focused on dynamic combat between two Realms, Vulpin, and Ontari, with players using diverse skill combinations based on the non-targeting system. 

Elyon was released in Korea on December 10th, 2020.

On October 20, 2021, Elyon was released in the EU/NA. The game was made free-to-play even before the release and those who had pre-ordered it got some compensation. The game ran in the West for less than a year before the publisher announced its closure. The game was discontinued in the EU and NA on December 7, 2022.

It was also announced that the game was shutting down in Korea on March 2, 2023.

References

External links

2020 video games
Inactive massively multiplayer online games
Massively multiplayer online role-playing games
Fantasy massively multiplayer online role-playing games
Steampunk video games
Unreal Engine games
Products and services discontinued in 2023
Video games developed in South Korea
Windows games
Kakao Games games
Asiasoft games